The following is a timeline of the history of the city of Fez, Morocco.

Prior to 20th century

 789 – Madinat Fas settlement (later Fes el Andalous) established by Idris I of Morocco.
 809 – Second settlement (later Fes el Karaouyine) established by Idris II of Morocco.
 818 – Andalucian Arab refugees arrive (approximate date).
 825 – Tunisian Kairouan refugees arrive.
 828 – Idris II of Morocco dies.
 848 – Yahya ibn Muhammad in power.
 859 – Al-Qarawiyyin Mosque founded.
 980 – Maghrawa in power.
 1033 – 1033 Fez massacre of Jews.
 1070 – Almoravids in power.
 1145 – Almohads take city.
 1248 – Marinids in power.
 1276 – Fes Jdid built.
 1325 – Al-Attarine Madrasa completed.
 1355 – Bou Inania Madrasa completed.
 1357 – Dar al-Magana water clock built.
 1408 – Lalla Ghariba mosque built at Fes Jdid.
 1437 – Probable date of the transfer of Jewish population of Fes el-Bali to the Mellah in Fes Jdid.
 1465 – 1465 Moroccan revolt.
 1472 – Wattassids in power.
 1522 – Earthquake.
 1554 – Capture of Fez by the Ottoman Empire
1554 – Recapture of Fez by the Saadian Sultan Mohammed Al-Shaykh.

 1576 – Capture of Fez by Abu Marwan Abd al-Malik I Saadi and his forces.
 1670 – Cherratine Madrasa rebuilt.

20th century

 1912
 March: Morocco becomes a French protectorate, per Treaty of Fez.
 April: 1912 Fez riots.
 Moroccan capital relocated from Fez to Rabat.
 1913 – Bab Boujeloud (gate) refurbished.
 1916 – Ville Nouvelle founded.
 1917 – Kissariyya market fire. 
 1920 – Public library opens.
 1931 - Future billionaire Othman Benjelloun born in Fez.
 1940 - student music association orchestra at fez as now music Institute in fez has founded there. (First called fez youth orchestra)
 1942 – Cinema Rex opens.
 1946 – Maghreb Association Sportive de Fez football club formed.
 1948 – Widad Fez football club formed.
 1951 - Population: 179,372.
 1963 – University of al-Qarawiyyin active.
 1973 - Population: 321,460 city; 426,000 urban agglomeration.
 1981 – Medina of Fez designated an UNESCO World Heritage Site.
 1990 – 14 December: Labour strike.
 1993 - Population: 564,000 urban agglomeration (estimate).
 1994 – World Sacred Music Festival begins.
 1999 – Rabat–Fes expressway built.

21st century

 2003 – Hamid Chabat becomes mayor.
 2004 – Population: 947,000.
 2005 – École nationale des sciences appliquées de Fès (school) established.
 2007 – After a construction period from 1994 to 2003,Fez Stadium opens in 2007.
 2011 ** International Institute for Languages and Cultures established.
 Population: 1,088,000.
 2014 - Population: 1,126,551 (estimate).
 2015
 City becomes part of the Fès-Meknès administrative region.
 Idriss Azami Al Idrissi becomes mayor.

See also
 Fez history
 Timelines of other cities in Morocco: Casablanca, Marrakesh, Meknes, Rabat, Tangier

References

Bibliography

in English
Published in 19th century

 

  (written in 16th century)

Published in 20th century
 

  

 
 
 

Published in 21st century

in French
 
  (+ table of contents)

External links

 Map of Fes, 1942.
 
 

Fez
Fez